Senator Lord may refer to:

Bert Lord (1869–1939), New York State Senate
George P. Lord (1831–1917), New York State Senate
Harry T. Lord (1863–1923), New Hampshire State Senate
Jarvis Lord (1816–1887), New York State Senate
Jim Lord (1948–2008), Minnesota State Senate
Otis Lord (1812–1884), Massachusetts State Senate
Simon Lord (1826–1893), Wisconsin State Senate
William A. Lord (1849–1927), Vermont State Senate
William Paine Lord (1838–1911), Oregon State Senate